This is a list of Malaysian states and federal territories sorted by their gross domestic product.

As of 3 November 2022 Malaysian Ringgit (symbol: RM, currency code: MYR) is equivalent to 0.211 United States dollar or 0.213 Euros.

Gross Domestic Product by state 

The following table is the list of the GDP of Malaysian states released by the Department of Statistics Malaysia.

Gross Domestic Product per capita by state 

The following table is a list of the GDP per capita of Malaysian states released by the Department of Statistics Malaysia.

See also 
 Economy of Malaysia
 List of ASEAN country subdivisions by GDP

References 

 https://www.dosm.gov.my/v1/index.php?r=column/cthemeByCat&cat=102&bul_id=TExzYmVmRC83S1hBMEUrUDVzczdLUT09&menu_id=TE5CRUZCblh4ZTZMODZIbmk2aWRRQT09
 https://www.johor.gov.my/kerajaan/bajet-johor/tahun-2019#tab-id-3 Johor 2018 estimate grow 5%-5.2%

GDP
States and federal territories of Malaysia
M
Malaysia